Sheeshram Singh Ravi is an Indian politician who served as Member of 13th Lok Sabha from Bijnor Lok Sabha constituency from 1999 to 2004. He is from Bharatiya Janata Party.

Personal life 
He was born on 19 January 1953 to Bhikka Singh and Durgiya Devi in Bijnor district. He married to Krishna Ravi on 4 May 1971.

References 

1953 births
Living people